Justin Edwards may refer to:

 Justin Edwards (actor) (born 1972), English actor and writer
 Justin D. Edwards (born 1970), Canadian professor in the Department of English at University of Surrey
 Justin Edwards (fighter) (born 1983), American mixed martial artist
 Justin Edwards (basketball, born 1992), Canadian professional basketball player
 Justin Edwards (basketball, born 2003), American basketball player